The 1961 SFR Yugoslavia Chess Championship was the 16th edition of SFR Yugoslav Chess Championship. Held in Zagreb, SFR Yugoslavia, SR Croatia. The tournament was won by Petar Trifunović.

References

External links 
 https://www.chessgames.com/perl/chess.pl?tid=18164
 https://www.partizanopedia.rs/1960%20sah.html

Yugoslav Chess Championships
1961 in chess
Chess